Cedar Crest is a census-designated place located in Wayne Township, Mifflin County in the state of Pennsylvania, United States.  It is located very close to the borough of Mount Union, along US 22.  As of the 2010 census, the population was 195 residents.

Demographics

References

Census-designated places in Mifflin County, Pennsylvania